The 2020 Columbus Crew SC season was the club's twenty-fifth season of existence and their twenty-fifth consecutive season in Major League Soccer, the top flight of American soccer. Columbus were also set to compete in the U.S. Open Cup, before its cancelation due to the COVID-19 pandemic. The season covers the period from November 11, 2019 to the start of the 2021 Major League Soccer season.

The 2020 season saw Columbus earn their second ever MLS Cup championship, their first since 2008. Columbus defeated Seattle Sounders FC, 3–0 in the championship match.

Roster

Non-competitive

Preseason

Midseason

Competitive

MLS

Standings

Eastern Conference

Overall table

Results summary

Results by round

Match results
On December 5, 2019, the league announced the home openers for every club, with Columbus playing New York City FC at Mapfre Stadium. The schedule for the remainder of the season was released by the league on December 19, 2019. Due to the COVID-19 pandemic, the original schedule had to be shortened and was released in installments. The remainder of the regular season schedule was announced on September 22, 2020.

MLS is Back Tournament

Postseason

U.S. Open Cup

The 2020 edition of the U.S. Open Cup was canceled on August 17 due to concerns about the COVID-19 pandemic.

Statistics

Appearances and goals
Under "Apps" for each section, the first number represents the number of starts, and the second number represents appearances as a substitute.

|-
|colspan=12 align=center|Players who left Columbus during the season:

|}

Disciplinary record

Clean sheets

Transfers

In

SuperDraft

The following players were selected by Columbus in the MLS SuperDraft. Only Miguel Berry signed a contract with the club.

Out

Loan out

Awards

Kits

See also
 Columbus Crew SC
 2020 in American soccer
 2020 Major League Soccer season

Notes

References

Columbus Crew seasons
Columbus Crew SC
Columbus Crew SC
Columbus Crew SC
2020